The 1992 Brisbane Rugby League season was the 71st season of semi-professional top level rugby league in Brisbane, Queensland, Australia.

Teams 

Source:

Final 
Western Suburbs 40 (J. Green 2, G. Sutton 2, S. Smith, G. Duncan, P. Schuler tries; J. Green 6 goals) defeated Eastern Suburbs 10 (P. Anderson, G. Street tires; G. Payne goal) at Lang Park.

References 

Rugby league in Brisbane
1992 in Australian rugby league